A Teixeira is a municipality in Ourense in the Galicia region of north-west Spain. It is in the very north of the province. In 2008, it had a population of 505.

References  

Municipalities in the Province of Ourense